No. 284 Squadron was a Royal Air Force squadron.

History
No. 284 Squadron was formed at RAF Gravesend, England on 7 May 1943 from detachments of other air-sea rescue (ASR) squadrons as an air-sea rescue squadron. The squadron moved to RAF Hal Far, Malta in July 1943. The squadron was equipped with the Supermarine Walrus and was responsible for air-sea rescue around Malta. Later the squadron headquarters moved to southern Italy during the Italian Campaign, the squadron providing detachments of aircraft as the campaign proceeded. Detachments of the squadron could so be found on Sicily, Sardinia, Tunisia and southern France. Warwicks were added to the establishment in March 1944 and the following September the Walruses were transferred to No. 293 Squadron RAF and the squadron received some Hurricanes in their place. At the end of the Second World War the squadron disbanded on Corsica at Pomigliano on 21 September 1945.

The squadron reformed at Nicosia, Cyprus on 15 October 1956, equipped with Sycamore HR Mk.14s in the ASR and support helicopter role. In November 1956, some Westland Whirlwind HAR Mk.2s were received and both types were operated until July 1959, when the Sycamores were retired. However, the following month the squadron was disbanded when it was re-numbered to No. 103 Squadron RAF.

Aircraft operated

See also
List of Royal Air Force aircraft squadrons

References

Notes

Bibliography

 Franks, Norman. Beyond Courage: Air Sea Rescue by Walrus Squadrons in the Adriatic, Mediterranean and Tyrrhenian Seas, 1942–1945. London: Grub Street, 2003. .
 Halley, James J. The Squadrons of the Royal Air Force and Commonwealth, 1918–1988. Tonbridge, Kent, UK: Air Britain (Historians) Ltd., 1988. .
 Jefford, C.G. RAF Squadrons: A Comprehensive Record of the Movement and Equipment of All RAF Squadrons and Their Antecedents Since 1912, Shrewsbury, Shropshire, UK: Airlife Publishing, 1988. . (second revised edition 2001. .)
 Rawlings, John D.R. Coastal, Support and Special Squadrons of the RAF and their Aircraft. London: Jane's Publishing Company Ltd., 1982. .

External links

 History of No.'s 281–285 Squadrons at RAF Web

Aircraft squadrons of the Royal Air Force in World War II
284 Squadron
Rescue aviation units and formations
Military units and formations established in 1943
Military units and formations disestablished in 1959
1943 establishments in the United Kingdom
1959 disestablishments in the United Kingdom